Mazza Gallerie was an upscale shopping mall in the Friendship Heights neighborhood of northwest Washington, D.C. Opened in 1977, it had  of retail space on three levels, a parking garage, and a direct connection to the Friendship Heights station of the Washington Metro. The last retail business closed in December 2022. The building is to be converted to residential apartments with retail on the ground floor.

The mall was named after Louise Mazza, whose daughter Olga inherited the land before it was developed. When the family sold the property, they attached a covenant requiring any future development to be called Mazza and to display a picture of Louise Mazza.

History
It was an early project of Herbert S. Miller's Western Development Corporation (now Mills Corporation), which later developed Potomac Mills, Georgetown Park, and Washington Harbour. Miller assembled a deal with property owner Olga Mazza and Neiman Marcus owner Stanley Marcus to build the development; Olga wanted an office building named after her mother and Miller wanted a residential component, but neither were approved. The developers envisioned the 60-store mall as the anchor for a new upscale shopping district: Washington's version of Fifth Avenue or Rodeo Drive. A retail corridor had already been established with the opening of a freestanding Woodward & Lothrop department store in 1950, followed by Lord & Taylor (1959) and Saks Fifth Avenue (1964) nearby, and a stop on the Metro Red Line had been approved in 1973.

Construction difficulties and labor disputes delayed construction of the $25 million project. The mall finally opened in November 1977, almost four years behind schedule. The delays had contributed to vacancies, as merchants could not plan for a firm opening date, and many retailers chose to open locations instead in White Flint Mall north of Bethesda. Traffic caused by the also-delayed construction of the Metro discouraged patrons from visiting the area. The poor early performance of the center contributed to a reputation as a "troubled" shopping center.

In June 1997, a group headed by Daniel McCaffery, who owned the Friendship Centre development across Wisconsin Avenue, acquired the mall for $28 million and opened up the marble block exterior with new windows, better lighting, and additional entrances. The project was financed by Security Capital Group, which was acquired by General Electric in 2001.

Among the added venues were a General Cinemas theatre and a restaurant, The R Room, owned by General Cinemas but operated by the restaurant division of Neiman Marcus. It closed in December 2000. Another restaurant, Rock Creek, operated in the restaurant space from 2007 to 2009.

In June 2004, Teachers Insurance and Annuity Association of America (TIAA) acquired the mall from General Electric for $77 million.

Ashkenazy Acquisition Corporation, led by Ben Ashkenazy, acquired the mall from TIAA for $78 million in January 2017. By then, the Friendship heights shopping district had been declining overall, as merchants closed or moved to the CityCenterDC district in downtown Washington, which opened in 2014, and as part of the general trend dubbed the "retail apocalypse." The COVID-19 pandemic accelerated these effects. In August 2020, the closure of the Neiman Marcus store was announced and Annaly Capital Management acquired the property via foreclosure. In February 2021, the closing of the AMC Theatres was announced.

The last retail business in the mall, TJ Maxx, and the mall itself permanently closed on December 24, 2022.

References

Shopping malls in Washington, D.C.
Defunct shopping malls in the United States
Shopping malls established in 1977
1977 establishments in Washington, D.C.
Shopping malls disestablished in 2022
2022 disestablishments in Washington, D.C.